Silberstedt was an Amt ("collective municipality") in the district of Schleswig-Flensburg, in Schleswig-Holstein, Germany. The seat of the Amt was in Silberstedt. In January 2008, it was merged with the Amt Schuby to form the Amt Arensharde.

The Amt Silberstedt consisted of the following municipalities:

Bollingstedt
Ellingstedt 
Hollingstedt 
Jübek 
Silberstedt
Treia

References 

Former Ämter in Schleswig-Holstein